Nar Bahadur Dhami is a Nepali communist politician and a member of the House of Representatives of the federal parliament of Nepal. He was elected from Kanchanpur-2 constituency, representing CPN UML of the left alliance, defeating his nearest rival NP Saud of Nepali Congress by more than 8,000 votes.

He was also the CPN UML candidate for Kanchanpur-3 constituency in the second constituent assembly election, in 2013.

References

Living people
21st-century Nepalese people
Communist Party of Nepal (Unified Marxist–Leninist) politicians
Nepal Communist Party (NCP) politicians
Place of birth missing (living people)
People from Kanchanpur District
Nepal MPs 2017–2022
1979 births